Kut Prathai is a tambon (subdistrict) of Det Udom District, in Ubon Ratchathani Province, Thailand. In 2021, it had a population of 13,687 people. Neighbouring subdistricts are (clockwise from the south) Kham Khrang, Phon Ngam, Mueang Det, Na Rueang, Na Yia, Nong Bua Hi, Ban Khaem, Ang Sila and Na Pho.

History
Kut Prathai legally gained subdistrict status in 1947. Previously, it was administered by the district's capital, Mueang Det. In 1980, the southern region of the tambon was split off to establish a new tambon, Kham Khrang.

Geography
The tambon is located in the northeastern region of Det Udom district, which is the river plain of the Lam Dom Yai river (ลำโดมใหญ่).

Administration
The tambon is divided into nineteen administrative villages (mubans; หมู่บ้าน) which are further divided into twenty-one community groups (Mu; หมู่). All of which were governed by the Kut Prathai subdistrict municipality (เทศบาลตำบลกุดประทาย).

The following is a list of the subdistrict's mubans, which roughly correspond to the villages:

References

Tambon of Ubon Ratchathani Province